Komarkov is a Slavic masculine surname, its feminine counterpart is Komarkova. It may refer to:

 Vera Komarkova (1942–2005), Czech-American mountaineer and botanist

See also
 Komárek, Czech surname

Russian-language surnames